Ripley Under Ground (also known as White on White) is a 2005 German-British-French crime thriller film directed by Roger Spottiswoode and based on the 1970 second novel in Patricia Highsmith's Tom Ripley series. It stars Barry Pepper as Ripley and features Willem Dafoe, Alan Cumming and Tom Wilkinson in supporting roles.

Plot summary 
After his friend, a successful young artist, is killed in a car accident, Tom Ripley (Pepper) and his friends hide his body and concoct a scheme in which they forge his paintings, eventually making a great deal of money. When an art collector (Dafoe) complains that a painting he bought from the gallery is a fake, Ripley must use his inimitable talents to defuse the problem by whatever means necessary.

Cast 
Barry Pepper as Tom Ripley
Willem Dafoe as Neil Murchison
Alan Cumming as Jeff Constant
Tom Wilkinson as John Webster
Jacinda Barrett as Héloïse Plisson
Claire Forlani as Cynthia
Ian Hart as Bernard Sayles
Douglas Henshall as Philip Derwatt
François Marthouret as Antoine Plisson

Release and reception 

Ripley Under Ground was produced during July and August 2003, but it was not released until two years later. The film was shown on the 2005 AFI Fest by American Film Institute. The film received a low-profile wide theatrical release on 6 November 2005, as well as being shown at the AFI Fest film festival in Los Angeles. It was released on DVD on 24 July 2007 in the Netherlands. Box office figures are not available for the film. 

Critical reviews have been scarce, owing to the smaller release.  Variety's review was less than positive, saying: "Although it strives to push Patricia Highsmith's best-known bad man in a snarky direction, Ripley Under Ground is too fidgety and unsure to settle on a sustained tone and ends up in a no man's land between hysterical satire and sleek Euro thriller. As previous filmic Ripleys demonstrated, from Purple Noon and The American Friend to The Talented Mr. Ripley and Ripley's Game, it's all in the casting, and the talented Mr. Barry Pepper is not capable of pulling off the demonically complicated and murderous con artist."

Adaptations 

The film is the fifth, and to date final, in the Ripley series of film adaptations, after Purple Noon 1960, The American Friend (1977), The Talented Mr Ripley (1999) and  Ripley's Game (2002). It is the lowest profile and least successful Ripley adaptation.

References

External links 
 
 

2005 films
2005 crime thriller films
American crime thriller films
British crime thriller films
English-language French films
English-language German films
Films directed by Roger Spottiswoode
Films based on American novels
Films based on crime novels
Films based on works by Patricia Highsmith
Films about fictional painters
Films about con artists
Films set in England
Films set in France
Films scored by Jeff Danna
French crime thriller films
German crime thriller films
2000s English-language films
2000s American films
2000s British films
2000s French films
2000s German films